Jason C. Stephens is an American Republican Party politician who became the Speaker of the Ohio House of Representatives on January 3, 2023. He has been the representative for the 93rd district since October 10, 2019, taking the seat after Ryan Smith left the House to become president of the University of Rio Grande.

2023 Speaker election 
Stephens's election to Speaker of the Ohio House of Representatives was an unexpected result. Stephens was able to secure election to the Speakership by receiving the votes of all of the Democratic caucus along with a third of the Republicans, even though he had previously lost an internal GOP caucus vote for leader. Democratic Leader Allison Russo noted that the selection of Stephens did not come with a "grand deal" but that the Stephens would work with her caucus on items ranging from education policy to redistricting.

References

21st-century American politicians
Lipscomb University alumni
Living people
Republican Party members of the Ohio House of Representatives
Speakers of the Ohio House of Representatives
Year of birth missing (living people)